There are two sub districts called Nawabganj Upazila in Bangladesh:
 Nawabganj Upazila, Dhaka
 Nawabganj Upazila, Dinajpur

See also
 Nawabganj Sadar Upazila in Nawabganj district of Rajshahi division